Diarsia rosaria, the rosy dart, is a moth of the family Noctuidae. It is found from Ontario, Quebec, New Brunswick, Nova Scotia, Newfoundland and Labrador, British Columbia, Alberta, Saskatchewan and Yukon in Canada, south to northern California and eastern Oregon.

It is abundant and widely distributed in wet conifer forests.

Its larvae feed on various grasses.

Subspecies
Diarsia rosaria rosaria (Grote, 1878)
Diarsia rosaria freemani Hardwick, 1950

External links
Images
Bug Guide

Diarsia
Moths of North America
Moths described in 1878